Manny Lewis is a 2015 Australian comedy-drama film starring Carl Barron.

Barron said the film was semi-autobiographical:
I wanted to do a story about my life on the road for the past 20 years and show people the other side of stand-up comedy, the side without all the laughter and all the isolation of being a comedian. It is also a bit of a love story and about trying to connect to someone. When you are performing you connect to thousands, but do you ever really connect to one?... Manny Lewis is just a well-known comic who ... has trouble holding down a relationship. Everyone has a trouble trying to connect to people. There is a bit of me in there, how much of me I will leave up to the audience to decide.

References

External links
Official film website

Review of film at Filmink
Review of film at SBS
Review of film at Sydney Morning Herald
Review of film at Guardian Australia
Review of film at WA Radio Drive - ABC
Review of film at Herald Sun

Films set in Sydney
2015 films
2015 comedy-drama films
Australian comedy-drama films
2010s English-language films
2010s Australian films